The United States men's national field hockey team represents the United States in the international field hockey competitions. The governing body is the United States Field Hockey Association (USFHA), which is a US Olympic Committee organization.

The team won bronze at the 1932 Summer Olympics, and has had success in the Pan American Games and Pan American Cup.

Field hockey is not a major sport at college level in the United States, so the men's team does not have as much experience as most other international teams that have professional players. The sport is largely thought of as a women's game in the United States; field hockey has historically been used as a "Title IX" sport to offset the numerous men who play college football, and as such, colleges have typically only sponsored women's field hockey teams. The players on the national team play overseas in European and Australian pro leagues. Despite this, the American team managed to achieve some limited success.

Tournament history

Summer Olympics
The United States hosted the Olympic field hockey tournaments three times. In their first Olympics in 1932, Team USA hosted India and Japan. With only three teams in the tournament, the U.S. lost both their games and finished third for the bronze medal. The US was the host nation for the Los Angeles 1984 Olympic Games. During group stages, Team USA lost to Australia 2–1. In the 9th-12th place playoff, the US lost to Kenya in sudden death penalty strokes 6-5 after a 1-1 regulation and then lost 11th/12th place game to Malaysia 9–8 in sudden death penalty strokes after 3–3 tie in regulation. The team finished last in tournament play. At the Atlanta 1996 Olympic Games, the squad finished last again.

 1932 – 
 1936 – 11th place
 1948 – 11th place
 1956 – 12th place
 1984 – 11th place
 1996 – 12th place

FIH Hockey World Cup
The US team has never qualified for an outdoor World Cup. However, the team has competed twice for the indoor World Cup, most recently in 2011.

Pan American Games
Finishing 5th at the 2015 Pan American Games, the USMNT missed out on qualifying for the Rio 2016 Olympic Games.

1967 – 
1971 – 5th place
1975 – 6th place
1979 – 6th place
1983 – 4th place
1987 – 
1991 – 
1995 – 
1999 – 5th place
2003 – 5th place
2007 – 7th place
2011 – 5th place
2015 – 5th place
2019 –

Pan American Cup
The U.S. missed out on the final of the 2009 Men's Pan American Cup from a missed penalty stroke in normal time. Had the penalty been converted the team would have won the final vs Canada for direct qualification to the World Cup. As it was, they lost in overtime on a golden goal and Canada went to the 2010 World Cup in India.

Hockey World League
In 2016, the USMNT competed in FIH Hockey World League Round 1 in Salamanca, Mexico. The U.S. Men's National Team put in a dominant performance to finish undefeated and as FIH Hockey World League Round 1 champions to secure a spot at FIH Hockey World League Round 2 in March 2017. The 6–1 win over Barbados added to USA's 33 goals while only allowing 2 over the 4 match tournament. Going into the final, the USMNT was familiar with their opponent as they had played Barbados in the first game and came out on top with a 3–1 victory. With the roster that was representing the US, the squad kept developing their play throughout the week culminating in a dominant performance in the final. Team USA finished third in Round 2 and didn't make it to the Semifinal Round of the 2016–17 Men's FIH Hockey World League.

 2012–13 – 28th place
 2014–15 – 30th place
 2016–17 – 21st place

Champions Challenge II
 2011 – 7th place

Players

Current squad
The following 16 players were named on 9 July 2019 for the 2019 Pan American Games in Lima, Peru.

Head coach: Rutger Wiese

Caps updated as of 10 August 2019, after the match against Chile.

See also
United States women's national field hockey team
USA Field Hockey
USA Field Hockey Hall of Fame

References

External links
Official website
FIH profile

National team
Americas men's national field hockey teams
Men